Yvette "Fanny" Truchelut is part owner of a bed-and-breakfast type of hostel in the department of Vosges, France. On August 11, 2006, Truchelut asked two female Muslim boarders to remove their headscarves in the public rooms of this hostel.

A lawsuit was initiated by Movement Against Racism and for Friendship Between People (MRAP). Truchelut was sued for refusal to provide a good or a service:
due to the origin, whether belonging to it or not belonging to it, of an ethnicity or a determined nationality (on grounds that two women were wearing the veil)
due to one's belonging, or not belonging, to a determined race (on grounds that two women were wearing the veil)
due to one's belonging, or not belonging, to a determined religion (on grounds that two women were wearing the veil)

Presidential candidate Philippe de Villiers offered free legal services to Fanny Truchelut. The trial began on October 2, 2007, and October 9 she was convicted, fined 5800 euros, and sentenced to four months of imprisonment. The case was unsuccessfully appealed.

In France, the case has been treated as symbolic of the Islamization of French society, the loss of control over private property, and new threats to the rights of women. In an open letter to President Sarkozy published on website Riposte Laïque, Truchelut focuses on the rights of women.  She argues that the Islamic veil is a symbol of the oppression of women and that her own arrest is symbolic of a larger struggle in France.

References

External links
 Islamisation : suite de l’affaire du gîte de Julienrupt et des femmes voilées, Bureau audiovisuel francophone
  5800 euros quatre mois avec sursis pour Fanny Truchelut, Come4news
 Archived search on Wikio

1953 births
Islam-related controversies in Europe
People from Vosges (department)
Living people